Aracaju–Santa Maria Airport  is the airport serving Aracaju, Brazil.

It is operated by AENA.

History
Although it had been in operation since the beginning of the 1950s, the official opening of the airport took place on 19 January 1958.

In 1961 began the first renovation of the airport complex, with an extension of the runway and enlargement of the passenger terminal.

In 1975 Infraero became the administrator of the airport, which later invested in further extension of the runway (completed in 1993) and in great enlargement of the passenger terminal (completed in 1998).

In 2012 the airport has already started the last extension through the construction of a completely new passenger terminal which will double its capacity.

Previously operated by Infraero, on March 15, 2019 AENA won a 30-year concession to operate the airport.

Airlines and destinations

Accidents and incidents
12 July 1951: a Lóide Aéreo Nacional Douglas DC-3/C-47 registration PP-LPG, still registered under Linhas Aéreas Paulistas – LAP, flying from Maceió to Aracaju, after aborting a landing in adverse conditions in Aracaju, overflew the runway and initiated a turn in low altitude to the right. The aircraft crashed during this turn. All 33 passengers and crew died, including the Governor of the state of Rio Grande do Norte Jerônimo Dix-sept Rosado Maia.

Access

See also

List of airports in Brazil
 Aracaju-Aeroclube de Sergipe

References

External links

Airports in Sergipe
Airports established in 1958
Buildings and structures in Aracaju